"Bad Little Kid" is a short horror story by Stephen King, which was originally published in German and French in an electronic version. The first paper print in English was in Kings 2015 short story collection, The Bazaar of Bad Dreams.

Plot 
Attorney Leonard Bradley visits his client, George Hallas, in prison. Hallas has been sentenced to death by lethal injection for the murder of a young boy. He will be executed in less than a week, despite Bradley's attempts to prevent it. Hallas has never explained why he committed this brutal act. 

Now he feels like talking about what he calls "the bad little kid": a six- or seven-year-old boy with orange hair, green eyes, and a beanie, who made Hallas's life a living hell for years.

Hallas's mother died during childbirth, so he was raised by his father and the housekeeper, Mama Nonie. His first encounter with the "Bad Little Kid" was in 1977. Hallas was good friends with a slightly older and mentally challenged girl named Marlee. One day, the orange-haired boy appeared and terrorized Marlee, causing her to be struck by a motor vehicle. 

Years later, when Hallas was having a relationship with a woman named Vicky, the kid appeared again, still the same age as he was back in 1977. His bullying drove Vicky to suicide. 

Three years after Hallas married Carla Winston, the kid caused a gas explosion in a mine that killed Hallas's father. He made a series of harassing phone calls to Mama Nonie, who cancelled phone service; she was unable to call for help when she suffered a heart attack. After many attempts to get pregnant, Carla and Hallas were expecting their first child; the Bad Little Kid caused an accident and Carla miscarried.

Hallas decided to set a trap for the boy. He became an active volunteer for the local church helping troubled boys. The kid showed up again after Hallas successfully helped one boy get desperately needed eye surgery. Hallas was prepared for him and killed the kid in front of dozens of witnesses. Hallas finishes his story with a warning to Bradley that the monstrous kid might come back. 

After Hallas' execution, Bradley finds a beanie in his car with two notes attached: one says "See you soon".

References

External links
 
The Independent review
Portland Press Herald review

Short stories by Stephen King
2015 short stories